Christopher John Baillie (born ) is a New Zealand politician who became a Member of Parliament for New Zealand at the 2020 general election, as a representative of the ACT New Zealand party.

Early life and career
In a speech to Parliament, Baillie said that he was born to a unionist, Labour-supporting household and he believes his contrasting political views originated from his father's support for marine engineer workers on strike. Baillie said that, at 12 years old, he considered the strike unreasonable.

Baillie worked in the police for 14 years, has owned a pub, and has worked as a special needs teacher. While working as a teacher he initiated a discussion group at his school, Nayland College, prompted by what he perceived as "hysteria" about climate change, and the effect of this on student mental health. Some of Baillie's former students have criticised his meetings, where he reportedly spoke out against well-known climate change activists including Alexandria Ocasio-Cortez and Greta Thunberg. Many people have criticised Baillie for being a climate change denier, however, Baillie rejects the term.

Political career

Baillie joined ACT at the end of 2019. He met the party's leader, David Seymour, in early 2020 and after that meeting decided to run for Parliament.

He did not win the electorate, placing fourth with 1320 votes, but ACT won 7.6% of the party vote, which entitled it to ten MPs, including Baillie. He is ACT's spokesperson for Small Business, Workplace Relations and Safety, Education, and Police.

Political views 
Baillie is in favour of reducing the effects of red tape on businesses. He has expressed concern about the effects on businesses of increases in the minimum wage or number of sick days, and the complexity of the personal grievance process. Baillie is in favour of 90-day employment trials, stating "The 90-day (employment) trials in my particular business worked really well. I work with disadvantaged kids and through my policing, I've worked with people who struggle to get a job, and taking away (90-day trials) was a real disservice and made it even more of a challenge for the most vulnerable people in our society to try and get a job." He is also in favour of charter schools.

Personal life
Baillie plays the trumpet and has been a member of multiple jazz bands. He has also played rugby for over 30 years. Baillie owns The Honest Lawyer restaurant in Nelson.

References

1960s births
Living people
ACT New Zealand MPs
Members of the New Zealand House of Representatives
New Zealand list MPs